Kongsvinger Idrettslag is a Norwegian sports club from the city of Kongsvinger in Hedmark, founded in 1892. Its men's football team is well-known, and it has teams for several other sports.

Athletics
Kongsvinger IL has an athletics section. Until 2009, it too used Gjemselund Stadion, which got rubber track in 1986. In 2009, Gjemselund Stadion was converted to a football-only stadium, forcing the athletics section to use other stadiums in the region. As of 2020, Skansesletta friidrettsbane is being used.

Grete Kirkeberg is a well-known athlete from Kongsvinger IL.

Football

Kongsvinger IL has several football teams, ranging from professional to children's teams. The professional men's team plays in the Norwegian First Division, and the women play in the Second Division (third highest).

Ice hockey

Kongsvinger Knights, founded in 1961, is Kongsvinger's ice hockey team. It soon became part of Kongsvinger Idrettslag.

Others
There are also clubs for handball, skiing, ice skating and gymnastics.

References

External links
 Official website, football club
 Official website, ice hockey team
 Official website, athletics section
 Official website, handball section

 
Sports teams in Norway
Sports clubs established in 1892
Athletics clubs in Norway
Sport in Hedmark
Kongsvinger
1892 establishments in Norway